The Lockheed L-100 Hercules is the civilian variant of the prolific C-130 Hercules military transport aircraft made by the Lockheed Corporation. Its first flight occurred in 1964. Longer L-100-20 and L-100-30 versions were developed. L-100 production ended in 1992 with 114 aircraft delivered. An updated variant of the model, LM-100J, has completed its first flight in Marietta, Georgia on 25 May 2017, and was set to start production in 2018–19.

Development

In 1959, Pan American World Airways ordered 12 of Lockheed's GL-207 Super Hercules to be delivered by 1962, to be powered by four 6,000 eshp Allison T56 turboprops. Slick Airways was to receive 6 such aircraft later in 1962. The Super Hercules was to be  longer than the C-130B; a variant powered by 6,445 eshp Rolls-Royce Tynes and a jet-powered variant with four Pratt & Whitney JT3D-11 turbofans were also under development. Both Pan American and Slick Airways (which had ordered six) canceled their orders and the other variants did not evolve past design studies.

Lockheed decided to produce a commercial variant based on a de-militarised version of the C-130E Hercules. The prototype L-100 (registered N1130E) first flew on April 20, 1964, when it carried out a 1-hour, 25-minute flight. The type certificate was awarded on 16 February 1965. Twenty-one production aircraft were then built with the first delivery to Continental Air Services on September 30, 1965.

Slow sales led to the development of two new, longer versions, the L-100-20 and L-100-30, both of which were larger and more economical than the original model. Deliveries totaled 114 aircraft, with production ending in 1992. Several L-100-20 aircraft were operated on scheduled freight flights by Delta Air Lines between 1968 and 1973.

An updated civilian version of the Lockheed Martin C-130J-30 Super Hercules was under development, but the program was placed on hold indefinitely in 2000 to focus on military development and production. On February 3, 2014, Lockheed Martin formally relaunched the LM-100J program, saying it expects to sell 75 aircraft. Lockheed sees the new LM-100J as an ideal replacement for the existing civil L-100 fleets.

The launch operator for the LM-100J will be Pallas Aviation, from 2019 they will operate two aircraft from Fort Worth Alliance Airport in the United States. By early March 2022 the three LM-100J aircraft (tail numbers N96MG, N71KM and N67AU) then owned by Pallas had begun flying dozens of flights between Ramstein AB and secondary military air facilities at Nowe Miasto nad Pilicą, Poland; Boboc, Romania; Sliač, Slovakia; Lielvārde, Latvia and Aalborg, Denmark.

Variants

Civilian variants are equivalent to the C-130E model without pylon tanks or military equipment.
L-100 (Model 382)
One prototype powered by four Allison 501-D22s and first flown in 1964
L-100 (Model 382B)
Production variant
L-100-20 (Model 382E and Model 382F)
Stretched variant certified in 1968 with a new  section forward of the wing and  section aft of the wing.
L-100-30 (Model 382G)
A further stretched variant with an additional  fuselage section.
LM-100J (Model 382J)
An updated civilian version of the military C-130J-30 model.
L-400 Twin Hercules
A twin-engine variant of the C-130.  It was advertised in at least one publication that it would have "more than 90% parts commonality" with the standard C-130.  The aircraft was shelved in the mid-1980s without any being built.

Operators

Civilian operators
In March 2011, a total of 36 Lockheed L-100 Hercules aircraft were in commercial service. Operators include Safair (4), Lynden Air Cargo (8), Transafrik (5), Libyan Arab Air Cargo (3), and other operators with fewer aircraft.

Military operators
In May 2011, 35 Lockheed L-100s were in use with military operators, including:
 Indonesian Air Force (10 ordered, 8 current with 6 in service)
 Libyan Air Force (5)
 Algerian Air Force (3)
 Ecuadorian Air Force (1)
 Kuwait Air Force (3 – L-100-30)
 Mexican Air Force (1)
 Peruvian Air Force (3)
 Philippine Air Force (4)
 Saudi Arabian Airlines (3 L-100-30 for Royal Flight)

Other users with fewer aircraft.
 Gabon Air Force (2 – 1 L-100-20 and 1 L-100-30)
 United Arab Emirates Air Force (1 – L-100-30)
 Argentine Air Force (1 – L-100-30 – LV-APW, later TC-100)
 Free Libyan Air Force (1 L-100 following Libyan civil war)

Specifications (L-100-30)

Accidents and incidents

 On 8 April 1987: a Southern Air Transport L-100-30 (registration N-517SJ) crashed due to loss of power in two engines, during an attempted go-around at Travis Air Force Base, California.  All 5 people on board died.
 On 2 September 1991: a Southern Air Transport L-100-20 (registration N521SJ) was written off after hitting a mine while on takeoff from Wau Airport. The 5 occupants survived with injuries.
 On 23 September 1994: a Heavylift Cargo Service L-100-30 (registration PK-PLV), leased from Indonesia-based Pelita Air Service, crashed off Kai Tak International Airport in Hong Kong after the number four propeller oversped, killing six of the 12 on board.
 On 25 August 2008: a Philippine Air Force L-100-20 (serial number 4593) of 220th Airlift Wing based in Mactan, Cebu, crashed into the sea shortly after take-off in Davao City. The aircraft lost contact after taking off from Francisco Bangoy International Airport shortly before midnight. Nine crew members and two passengers were on board when the aircraft crashed.
 On 20 May 2009: an Indonesian Air Force L-100-30 (serial number A-1325) of 31st Squadron crashed into homes and erupted in flames, killing at least 98 people. The wreckage of the Hercules was scattered in a rice paddy near Magetan, East Java, about 160 kilometres east of Yogyakarta. The plane was carrying more than 100 passengers and crew on route from Jakarta to the eastern province of Papua via Magetan.

See also

References
Notes

Bibliography

External links

 Lockheed L-100 Hercules. airliners.net
 Lockheed L-100 Hercules specifications in comparison to other air cargo aircraft
 

L-0100
1960s United States airliners
Four-engined tractor aircraft
High-wing aircraft
Four-engined turboprop aircraft
L-100
Aircraft first flown in 1964